The Principality of Madripoor or Madripoor is a fictional island appearing in American comic books published by Marvel Comics. The island is depicted as being located in maritime Southeast Asia, and has appeared mostly associated with stories from the X-Men series. Based on illustrations, it is in the southern portion of the Strait of Malacca between Singapore and Sumatra.

Madripoor has made several appearances in Marvel-related media, such as the Marvel Anime franchise and the Marvel Cinematic Universe series The Falcon and The Winter Soldier (2021).

Publication history
Madripoor first appeared in The New Mutants #32 (October 1985). It was created by Chris Claremont and Steve Leialoha. Madripoor was featured heavily in the Wolverine solo series (starting 1988). Penned by Chris Claremont and artwork by John Buscema.

Madripoor received an entry in the Official Handbook of the Marvel Universe Update '89 #4.

History
Madripoor is a fictional location apparently modeled on Singapore. They are both wealthy maritime Asian island port nations at a strategic location with a single major city. However, Madripoor is not Singapore itself, as Singapore exists in the Marvel Universe as well, including the comics explicitly stating Madripoor as it being an island south of Singapore. Also distinct from Singapore is that Madripoor is divided between a Hightown and Lowtown, places which are wealthy and crime-stricken respectively. X-23 and Gambit once chartered a boat from Singapore to Madripoor, showing that they are both distinct locations.

Its capital and single large city is also called Madripoor. Madripoor was once a haven for pirates, and that tradition is somewhat continued today with its lawless quality. The principality does not allow other nations to extradite criminals. However, it is one of the business capitals of the Pacific Rim, with its own Trade Center.

Other locations of note in the Central Business District are the Bank of Hong Kong and the Bank of Malaysia, luxurious Sovereign Hotel, and the Prince's Palace, said to rival Versailles.

During World War II, Baron Strucker and The Hand attempted to obtain a young Natasha Romanova, and were opposed by Captain America and Logan.

An attempt was made to conquer the nation by China. General Lo Chien attempts an invasion using modern and mystical weaponry but is stopped by the ad-hoc 'Heroes for Hire' group.

The nation was taken over by HYDRA with Madame Hydra as de facto ruler, using the nation to finance terrorist plots against the world. Side-effects of this are seen in Spider-Woman: Agent Of S.W.O.R.D. With HYDRA's terrorist operations causing deaths in the thousands, Iron Man and S.H.I.E.L.D. took it upon themselves to overthrow the HYDRA regime and place the nation in the hands of Tyger Tiger, as she was the only person—apart from the long-absent Patch—who the natives would follow in the event of a revolt. Stark wanted someone who would run Madripoor the right way without needing someone else to monitor them and ensure that the situation did not repeat itself.

Despite this, the real power fell to Seraph, the owner and operator of the Princess Bar. Her death followed the death of Police Chief Tai. Criminal elements began fighting over Madripoor, forcing Tyger Tiger into hiding. Viper tried to make a return, with programmable murderous entities called Predator X.

Madripoor is later controlled by Wolverine's son Daken after he managed to wrestle and manipulate power away from Tyger Tiger by acquiring control of various financial resources and key people. This results in several days of intense violence throughout the entire nation. Part of this chaos was the result of Malcolm Colcord, who wanted free rein in Madripoor for his super-soldier experiments. Colcord was stopped by Daken, Tyger, X-23 and Gambit. After Daken's death, Tyger Tiger was once again the figurehead of Madripoor.

A prominent Madripoor hotel was later used to hold an auction for a videotape of Hawkeye committing an illegal assassination. Barton was captured while trying to retrieve the tape, but was rescued by Kate Bishop, who had infiltrated the hotel by tying up and gagging Madame Masque and stealing her identity.

In the pages of Avengers World, it is revealed that Madripoor rests on the head of a giant dragon that is as large as an island continent. The giant dragon was awakened by a ritual performed by Gorgon and the Hand. The beast decides to attack Shanghai, China. It is beaten and returned in the following issue by Shang-Chi.

Mystique tried to make Madripoor a mutant utopia; this involved flooding the island with 'Mutant Growth Hormone', a drug which grants powers.

Magneto and the time displaced X-Men use Madripoor's Hightown as the location for their headquarters in X-Men Blue where Magneto is secretly trying to find a way to send the time-displaced X-Men back to their original timeline under the guise of working alongside them. At the same time, the time-displaced X-Men secretly train themselves in case Magneto returns to his villainous roots and tries to kill them.

Tyger Tiger re-establishes herself as the pre-eminent power on the island. She is opposed by the criminal Kimura, who has gained control over most of the criminal elements. A failed assassination attempt on Tyger is stopped by the X-Men, Gambit and the young hero Gabby.

During the "Hunt for Wolverine" storyline, Kitty Pryde led Domino, Jubilee, Psylocke, Rogue, and Storm to Madripoor to confront Magneto when he was suspected of stealing Wolverine's body. He agreed to tell them everything he knows at the King's Impresario Restaurant in Hightown. When it came to the meeting, it was revealed that Magneto is actually Mindblast in disguise as Kitty Pryde's group are attacked by Viper, Knockout, Sapphire Styx, and Snake Whip. This trip also included investigating Madripoor's space launching facilities, which are available for anyone to rent.

Wolverine learns, through an adventure with the Black Cat, that the pre-teen criminal conspiracy called "The Hellfire Club," has taken over the criminal underworld of Madripoor. This group, sometimes referred to as Homines Verendi, has taken direct hostile action against the island nation Krakoa.

During the "Iron Man 2020" event, Albert arrived on Madripoor looking for Elsie-Dee. After meeting Tyger Tiger, Albert was directed to Donald Pierce's company Reavers Universal Robotics where he confronted Donald Pierce. After Albert subdues the Reavers, Donald states that he sold Elsie-Dee's head to yakuza boss Kimura, the arms to the Jade Dragon Triad, and the legs to the Vladivostok Mafia. After he gets the parts from them, Albert puts Elsie-Dee back together. In light of Albert's actions towards them, the Reavers, Kimura, the Jade Dragon Triad, and the Vladivostok Mafia decide to take action against Albert vowing that he will never make it out of Madripoor alive. In downtown Madripoor, Donald Pierce and the Reavers are traveling through the vacant streets as they state that Albert and Elsie-Dee will have to travel through the Vladivostok Mafia's turf before they can engage them. Albert and Elsie-Dee engage the Vladivostok Mafia where they kill some members. Albert and Elsie-Dee then enter the Jade Dragon Triad's turf and fight its members. On the J-Town stretch of High Street, Kimura's men prepare for Albert and Elsie-Dee's arrival as Kimura informs Sachinko that they cannot let Elsie-Dee walk around with the account books' information in her head. As Albert and Elsie-Dee approach, Kimura's men open fire as they ram through the roadblock. Kimura stops the attack and informs Albert and Elsie-Dee about what Donald Pierce has planned for him at Madripoor Airport. As Kimura's limousine fools the Reavers into thinking that Albert and Elsie-Dee hijacked it and fire the railgun on it, Kimura smuggles Albert and Elsie-Dee out of Madripoor in a box claiming that it is filled with slot machine parts bound for Macao. Elsie-Dee states to Albert that they will get him upgraded.

Geography
Madripoor is estimated to be  in diameter. Its coastline is pockmarked with deep water bays and inlets. The center of the island is a large plateau with steep cliffs. As mentioned above, Madripoor rests on the head of a giant dragon that is as large as an island continent.

Points of interest
The following are locations found in Madripoor:

 Buccaneer Bay - This is where Madripoor corsairs ranged far and wide for their prey. It is also called Dagger Bay.
 Hightown - A district of Madripoor for the rich and powerful. Hightown is one of the wealthiest places in the world. Its spectacular architecture and advanced technology make it truly a city of the 21st century.
 Imperial Hotel - A hotel where Wolverine once rescued Lindsay McCabe.
 King's Impresario Restaurant - A popular restaurant in Hightown.
 Madripoor Police Force Headquarters - The headquarters of the Madripoor Police Force.
 Reavers Universal Robotics - A factory owned by Donald Pierce where he has improved the production of his Reavers.
 Royal Palace - 
 Sovereign Hotel - It is claimed to be the expensive yet finest hotel in the whole world.
 X-Mansion - A base of operations in Madripoor and a variation of the X-Mansion where Magneto and the time-displaced X-Men work on preserving Professor X's dream by actively seeking out threats against it. It is also where Magneto is working on finding a way to send the time-displaced X-Men back to their original timeline. Currently it is inhabited by the mutant vigilantes the Raksha. 
 Lowtown - The crime-impoverished district of Madripoor. Lowtown is a throwback to the lawlessness of a thousand years ago: a place of rampant crime and depravity where anything can be bought.
 Brass Monkey Saloon - It is also called the Bronze Monkey and located on 332 Cyan Street.
 Club Azimut - A nightclub that is a front for the Vladivostok Mafia.
 Dream Street - A street in Lowtown.
 Foxy Den Strip Bar -
 Harbor Bar - Thunderbolt Ross once visited this bar before looking for recruits for his incarnation of the Thunderbolts.
 Jade Dragon Triad's Factory - A factory owned by the Jade Dragon Triad who use the slave labor their for their operations like making counterfeit Iron Man toys.
 Madame Joy's Brothel - A brothel owned by Madame Joy.
 Princess Bar - A drinking establishment in Lowtown. It was run by a man named O'Donnell and his silent partner Wolverine (under the alias of "Patch"). The Princess Bar serves as an oasis of elegance and style. Frightened by Lowtown's dangerous reputation, tourists avoid the Princess Bar after dark. At night, the Princess Bar becomes a gathering place for local residents from both Hightown and Lowtown. The Princess Bar is also a fine restaurant with cabaret entertainment. It is connected to a wide network of smuggling tunnels via the basement. Its second floor is off-limits to most. The bar now has a hotel addition, financed by Krakoan interests.
 Wharfside - One of the worst spots in Lowtown.
 Empty Quarter - A section of the city where one street does NOT consistently lead to the next. The only stable point is by the lighthouse. Attempted flight from the Empty Quarter leads straight into the Negative Zone.
 Stinger - A S.H.I.E.L.D. safehouse and second generation secret base whose location is only known to Nick Fury.

Known residents
Notable current and former residents of Madripoor include:
 Aardwolf - The mutant, Chon Li, is the local Triads crimelord.
 Angel (past) - Formerly living in Madripoor with Magneto. Later return to his former timeline.
 Beast (past) - Formerly living in Madripoor with Magneto. Later return to his former timeline.
 Bloodscream - Sadistic former Nazi with vampiric superpowers. Worked as an enforcer for General Coy and Viper alongside Roughhouse.
 Archie Corrigan (deceased) - an American expatriate living in Madripoor and working as a local pilot and smuggler. He is an associate and friend of Wolverine (known as Patch in Madripoor). Corrigan is a veteran and former pilot for the US military, and he is the owner of the local South Seas Skyways (a company that utilizes mostly small aircraft and cargo planes)
 General Nguyen Ngoc Coy - Former South Vietnamese general who became a powerful crime lord in Madripoor and a rival of fellow crime lord Tyger Tiger.
 Cyclops (past) - Formerly living in Madripoor with Magneto. Later return to his former timeline.
 Dragoness - Former MLF member and current resident of Krakoa.
 Jessica Drew - worked as a private investigator in Madripoor during her hiatus from her role as Spider-Woman.
 Harriers - A team of mercenaries.
 Iceman (past) - Formerly living in Madripoor with Magneto. Later return to his former timeline.
 Karma - Member of the New Mutants, lived in Madripoor while trying to bring her uncle, General Coy, to justice. 
 Magneto - Formerly living in Madripoor with the time-displaced X-Men. Later resided at Krakoa
 Marvel Girl (past) - Formerly living in Madripoor with Magneto. Later return to his former timeline.
 Lindsay McCabe - an American actress and expatriate living in Madripoor. She became a close acquaintance of Wolverine.
 Mister X - Champion of Madripoor and also a mutant.
 O'Donnell (deceased) - The co-owner of the Princess Bar.
 Patch (alias of Wolverine) - Co-owner of the Princess Bar.
 Prince Baran - Former ruler. Murdered by General Coy.
 Raksha - A vicious team of mutant vigilantes operating out of the X-Mansion in Hightown. They strive to honor the memory of Patch.
 Roche (deceased) - A crime lord.
 Rose Wu (deceased) - A friend of Patch.
 Roughouse - Enforcer to General Coy and Viper.
 Sabretooth - He once lived in Madripoor in 1959.
 Scorpion - She was born in Lowtown, Madripoor.
 Sapphire Styx - A psychic vampire.
 Seraph (deceased) - Former lover and trainer of Wolverine.
 Tai - Chief of the Madripoor Police Force and ally of Logan.
 Tyger Tiger (alias of Jessan Hoan) - Former revolutionary and current head of state.
 Viper - Terrorist and recently deposed ruler of Madripoor.

Alternate versions
A future version of Madripoor is the site of a battle between the Guardians of the Galaxy and the criminal gang headed by Rancor."

In other media

Television
 Madripoor appears in series set in the Marvel Anime franchise:
 In Marvel Anime: Wolverine, Shingen Yashida holds Mariko Yashida and Hideki Kurohagi's wedding in Madripoor's Dragon Palace, with a booby-trapped and hostile resident populated route called the "Hell's Road" serving as a direct route to it.
 In Marvel Anime: Blade, the eponymous character and Makoto head to Madripoor in search of Deacon Frost. Along the way, they encounter Wolverine, who helps them stop the Viper Gang from producing silver bullets for the vampire organization, Existence.
 Madripoor appears in the Ultimate Spider-Man episode "Game Over". Arcade establishes a base on the island to access nuclear missile control codes and start World War III. However, he is foiled by Spider-Man, Captain America, and Wolverine.
 Madripoor appears in the live-action Marvel Cinematic Universe series The Falcon and the Winter Soldier episode "Power Broker". This version of the island is ruled by the titular character, who had resided there ever since she became a fugitive from the U.S government, and is located in the Indonesian archipelago.
 Madripoor is mentioned in passing in the live-action Marvel Cinematic Universe series Moon Knight episode 3 "The Friendly Type".

Film
Madripoor appears in Avengers Confidential: Black Widow & Punisher. The Black Widow and the Punisher are sent to Madripoor to stop an illegal weapons auction arranged by Leviathan.

References

External links
 Madripoor at Marvel.com
 Madripoor at Marvel Wiki
 Madripoor at Comic Vine

Fictional Asian countries
Fictional principalities
X-Men
Fictional island countries
Marvel Comics countries